Albert Evers (1868 – after 1890) was an English footballer who played in the Football Alliance for Small Heath. Born in Birmingham, Evers moved up from junior football to provide cover for Small Heath's half-back line. He played twice towards the end of the 1890–91 Football Alliance season, deputising for Caesar Jenkyns and Harry Morris respectively, then returned to local football later that year. Evers died in his native Birmingham.

References

1868 births
Year of death missing
Footballers from Birmingham, West Midlands
English footballers
Association football defenders
Birmingham City F.C. players
Football Alliance players
Date of birth missing